Andrew Mackay may refer to:

 Andrew Mackay (mathematician) (1760–1809), Scottish mathematician
 Andrew William McKay (art dealer) (died 1899), British art dealer
 William Andrew MacKay (1929–2013), Canadian lawyer
 Andy Mackay (born 1946), English musician, founder of Roxy Music
 Andrew MacKay (born 1949), British Conservative politician
 Andrew Mackay (British Army officer), British Army major general
 Andy McKay  (born 1980), New Zealand cricketer
 Andrew Mackay (swimmer) (born 1985), Olympic swimmer from the Cayman Islands